H. H. Maharani Sahib Raseshwari Rajya Laxmi is a former queen of Jaisalmer. She is the widow of Maharawal Brijraj Singh, Maharawal of Jaisalmer. She has two sons, Maharajkumar Chaitanya Raj Singh Bhati (born 24 December 1993) and Maharajkumar Janmajeya Singh Bhati (born 19 December 2000).

Causes 
She has spoken for female empowerment, as well as against female infanticide and child marriage. One of her initiatives includes collaborating with an American NGO, Chithra, to open a girls-only school only for girls and a center for women's empowerment.

Politics 
She took part in the 2018 Rajasthan Assembly Elections, campaigning from her home in Jaisalmer.

References

External links
After foray into politics, Jaisalmer royal keeps BJP, Congress guessing; Hindustan Times; Sep. 11, 2018

Living people
Indian royalty
People from Jaisalmer
Rajasthani people
Year of birth missing (living people)